Cory Cogeneration Station is a natural gas-fired station owned by SaskPower and located near Saskatoon, Saskatchewan, Canada.  The plant operates at 260 MW in a conventional generation mode and at 228 MW in a cogeneration mode. Steam from the plant is used to supply the Potash Corp Cory Mine.

The facility was originally developed as a joint venture of SaskPower and ATCO in 2003. SaskPower took full ownership in 2019 when it purchased ATCO's 50% stake.

Description 

The Cory Cogeneration Station consists of:
 two GE PG 7121EA Gas Turbines (85 MW)
 two Heat Recovery Steam Generators (140 tonnes per hour) and
 one GE Steam Turbine (90 MW)

See also 

 SaskPower

References

External links 
 SaskPower Station Description

Natural gas-fired power stations in Saskatchewan
Buildings and structures in Saskatoon
ATCO
Vanscoy No. 345, Saskatchewan